Johann Baptiste Lingg is a 1920 German silent historical film directed by Arthur Teuber and starring Carl Auen, Irmgard Bern and Frida Richard.

The film's art direction was by Julian Ballenstedt and E.A. Zirkel.

Cast
 Carl Auen as Johann Baptiste Lingg  
 Irmgard Bern as Maria Braun 
 Frida Richard as Frau Lingg  
 Ludwig Hartau as Wilhelm I., Kurfürst von Hessen
 Albert Patry as Johann Lingg  
 Alexander Ekert as Marias Vater  
 Georg John as Gutsverwalter Wolleck  
 Edmund Löwe as Napoleon Bonaparte
 Fred Immler as Leutnant Joui  
 Oscar Marion as Carl Schröter  
 Friedrich Degner as Pforr, Tuchbereiter  
 Ilse Wilke as Mutter Schröter 
 Viktor Senger as General Barbot  
 Hella Thornegg as Marias Mutter

References

Bibliography
 Jean-Pierre Mattei. Napoléon & le cinéma: un siècle d'images. Editions Alain Piazzola, 1998.

External links

1920 films
1920s historical films
German historical films
Films of the Weimar Republic
German silent feature films
Napoleonic Wars films
Depictions of Napoleon on film
German black-and-white films
1920s German films